ST Sea Alarm was a 263-ton tug which was built as
Empire Ash in 1941 for the British Ministry of War Transport  (MoWT). She was sold in 1947 and renamed  Flying Fulmar. She was sold in 1956 and renamed Sea Alarm. On retirement in 1973 she became an exhibit at the Welsh Industrial and Maritime Museum in Cardiff, but was controversially scrapped in 1998 after the closure of the museum.

History

Empire Ash was built by John Crown & Sons Ltd, Sunderland as yard number 201. She was launched on 13 August 1941 and completed on 17 October 1941. She was built for the MoWT. On 15 May 1946, Empire Ace was sold for £18,750 to Clyde Shipping Co. Ltd, Glasgow and renamed Flying Fulmar. In May 1956 she was sold to C. J. King & Sons, Bristol, and renamed Sea Alarm. She was operated under the management of the Alarm Steam Tug Co. Ltd. In January 1973 she was sold to Thos. W. Ward, Briton Ferry, for scrapping, but was resold the following month to the Welsh Industrial and Maritime Museum in Cardiff. She was restored by 1978 and was dry-docked for many years at Roath Dock. The museum closed on 1 June 1998 and Sea Alarm was scrapped apart from her engine. Questions were asked by the Select committee on Welsh Affairs about the scrapping of the tug as there was public outcry at the time.

Official Number and code letters
Empire Ash had the UK Official Number 168694 and used the Code Letters BCRK. Official Numbers were a forerunner to IMO Numbers. Sea Alarm was subsequently assigned IMO number 5315943.

References

External links

 Ships Nostalgia thread about Sea Alarm

Ships built on the River Wear
1941 ships
Empire ships
Ministry of War Transport ships
Merchant ships of the United Kingdom
Steamships of the United Kingdom
Tugboats of the United Kingdom
Museum ships in the United Kingdom
History of Cardiff